The Sound of Johnny Cash is the eighth studio album by American singer-songwriter Johnny Cash, released on June 4, 1962. Among other songs, it contains "In the Jailhouse Now", a Jimmie Rodgers cover which reached #8 on the Country charts, and "Delia's Gone", which Cash would re-record years later, on American Recordings, in 1994. Cash would also go on to record a significantly slower, more ballad-like version of "I'm Free from the Chain Gang Now", which was ultimately released in 2006 on American V: A Hundred Highways as the last track on the album.

During the recording sessions for the album, Cash rerecorded his Sun Records hits "Folsom Prison Blues", "Hey Porter" and "I Walk the Line", but none of these versions were ultimately used on the album and sat unreleased until the 1990s.

Cover imagery 
The original 1962 album features a photograph of Johnny Cash taken by American photographer Leigh Wiener at his studio in Los Angeles, California.

Track listing

Personnel
 Johnny Cash - vocals, rhythm guitar
 Luther Perkins - lead guitar
 Ray Edenton - guitar
 Don Helms - steel guitar
 Marshall Grant - bass
 Buddy Harman - drums
 Floyd Cramer - piano

Charts
The album did not chart in the Billboard album charts. In 1962 the single "In the Jailhouse Now" peaked at #8 in the Billboard Country Singles.

References

1962 albums
Johnny Cash albums
Columbia Records albums